John Ramsay may refer to:


Politics
John Ramsay (British Army officer) (1775–1842), general and Member of Parliament for Aberdeen Burghs, 1806–1807
John Ramsay (of Kildalton) (1814–1892), Member of Parliament for Stirling Burghs, 1868, and Falkirk Burghs, 1874–1886
John Ramsay, 13th Earl of Dalhousie (1847–1887), Scottish politician, Member of Parliament for Liverpool, 1880
Jack Ramsay (politician) (born 1937), Canadian politician

Sports
Jack Ramsay (1925–2014), American basketball coach
John Ramsay (Australian footballer) (1930–1983), Australian rules footballer
John Ramsay (footballer, born 1896) (1896–1917), Scottish footballer
Bill Ramsay (athlete) (1928–1988), Australian middle-distance runner John William Ramsay

Others

John Ramsay, 1st Lord Bothwell (c. 1464–1513)
John Ramsay, 1st Earl of Holderness (c. 1580–1626), Scottish nobleman
John Ramsay of Ochtertyre (1736–1814), Scottish writer
John Ramsay (businessman) (1841–1924), Scottish-born Australian businessman
John Ramsay (commissioner) (1862–1942), Chief Commissioner of Balochistan
John Ramsay (surgeon) (1872–1944), Australian surgeon
John Ramsay (magician) (1877–1962), Scottish magician
John Ramsay (1904-1966), son of William Ramsay, founder of Kiwi shoe polish (grandson of businessman John Ramsay (1841–1924), above) 
John Ramsay or Johnny Ramensky (1905–1972), Scottish criminal
John G. Ramsay (1931–2021), British structural geologist

See also
John Ramsey (disambiguation)